Marquice Jermal Cole [Mar-KWEECE] (born November 13, 1983) is a former American football cornerback of the National Football League (NFL). He was signed by the Oakland Raiders as an undrafted free agent in 2007. He played college football at Northwestern.

Cole has been a member of the Tennessee Titans, New Orleans Saints, New York Jets, New England Patriots, and Denver Broncos

Professional career

Oakland Raiders
Cole who went undrafted out of Northwestern was picked up by the Oakland Raiders following the completion of the 2007 NFL Draft. Cole was later waived by the team on September 2, 2007.

Tennessee Titans
Cole would be signed by the Tennessee Titans and placed on the team's practice squad on December 11, 2007. Cole was later re-signed by the team on January 7, 2008. Cole was later waived by the Titans on August 30, 2008.

New Orleans Saints
Cole was signed to the New Orleans Saints practice squad on December 10, 2008. He was later released from the team.

New York Jets
On February 17, 2009, the New York Jets would sign Cole. Cole was waived by the team on September 15, 2009. He was re-signed to the team's practice squad two days later on September 17, 2009. On September 23, 2009, Cole was promoted to the active roster.
Cole made several tackles throughout the 2009 season primarily playing on special teams.

Cole was an "integral" part of the Jets' special teams unit as a gunner and he had improved his understanding of the defensive schemes to the point where he was involved in packages on defense. Cole started the Jets' final regular season game against the Buffalo Bills recording his first two interceptions, one of which he returned for his first career touchdown.

Cole, an exclusive rights free agent, signed a one-year contract with the Jets on January 26, 2011.

New England Patriots
Cole, a free agent, signed with the New England Patriots on March 19, 2012. On March 20, 2013, Cole re-signed with Patriots. The terms of the contract were not disclosed. On September 27, 2013, Cole was released by the Patriots. Cole played in the first 3 regular season games, but recorded no statistics. On October 1, 2013, Cole was re-signed to the Patriots. On December 26, 2013, he was released yet again.

Denver Broncos
Cole was signed by the Broncos on January 14, 2014 after injuries to Chris Harris, Jr. and Derek Wolfe.

Personal
Cole has one son, Marquice Cole Jr. Cole is an MMA fan.

References

External links
Denver Broncos bio
New England Patriots bio
New York Jets bio
Northwestern Wildcats bio

1983 births
Living people
Players of American football from Chicago
African-American players of American football
American football cornerbacks
Northwestern Wildcats football players
Oakland Raiders players
Tennessee Titans players
New Orleans Saints players
New York Jets players
New England Patriots players
Denver Broncos players
People from Cook County, Illinois
21st-century African-American sportspeople
20th-century African-American people